SV Altlüdersdorf is a German football club based in Gransee, currently playing in the Brandenburg-Liga (VI) after 9 seasons in the NOFV-Oberliga Nord (V).

History
Established as Sportverein Altlüdersdorf in 1926, the club was lost after World War II. A successor side was established 1 January 1970 as BSG Traktor Altlüdersdorf and played as part of the separate competition that emerged in Soviet-occupied East Germany. Following the reunification of Germany in 1990 the club reclaimed its traditional name.

After a period in the Brandenburg-Liga the club won the league in 2010 and earned promotion to the NOFV-Oberliga Nord where it played until 2019, when it announced its voluntary demotion to the Brandenburg-Liga.

Honours
The club's honours:
 Brandenburg-Liga
 Champions: 2010
 Brandenburgischer Landespokal
 Runners-up: 2013

References

External links 
 SV Altlüdersdorf 

Football clubs in Germany
Football clubs in Brandenburg
Oberhavel
Association football clubs established in 1926
1926 establishments in Germany